Mike Landers (born 27 April 1943 in Saint John, New Brunswick) was a Liberal party member of the House of Commons of Canada. He was a lawyer and addiction counsellor by career.

He won New Brunswick's Saint John—Lancaster electoral district in the 1974 federal election and served in the 30th Canadian Parliament. He lost the following election in 1979 to Eric Ferguson of the Progressive Conservative party, but regained the seat within months in the 1980 federal election.

Landers left politics after serving in the 30th and 32nd Canadian Parliaments and became a Commissioner with the Canadian Transport Commission from 1984 to 1987.

References

External links
 

1943 births
Living people
Politicians from Saint John, New Brunswick
Members of the House of Commons of Canada from New Brunswick
Liberal Party of Canada MPs